Zumarraga, officially the Municipality of Zumarraga, is a 5th class island municipality in the province of , Philippines. According to the 2020 census, it has a population of 16,279 people.

It is formerly known as Buad, Rawis, and Kawayan. The town itself, notably its downtown area, is considered by many heritage scholars as a heritage zone due to the many heritage houses within its vicinity. The local government unit is currently conserving the history and traditions of the town.

The town is also famous for two beverages which it specializes in. These are the kinutil (tuba wine with egg yolk) and dubado (tuba wine with melted tablea).

History

The town of Zumaraga was known for quite a number years before some other towns in Samar were recognized. This was because of a flourishing fishing industry in the town.
 
This started with a small settlement of a few villagers who came with their families from Leyte. They discovered the place while they were on their fishing trips and were overtaken by a storm during which they anchored and took refuge on the place now known as “Rawes”. To their amazement they found the place good for settlement, naturally pleasing due to the presence of bamboo. So when they returned to settle they named the place “Kawayan”.
 
These villagers became prosperous because of the abundance of fish in the waters which surrounded the islands. It as for this reason that many people from neighboring places flocked for some fishing business. The first to come were the Ferreras from Leyte.
 
The news of this rich fishing village reached the ears of the Moro pirates so they extended their piracy to Visayan waters. To keep themselves safe, the natives built strong stone fortifications on the top of the hill overlooking the whole town. Today, these fortifications still remain, a symbol of the unity of our forefathers; without their unity these forts would not have been built.
 
Nobody can tell the exact date of the coming of the Spaniards to the islands, but in 1848 a Spanish friar was sent to the place. It was said that with their coming, they already found the natives willing to obey and follow the laws of the self-governing body which ruled the village. The name of the place was already “Buad” derived from the local dialect “Binuwaaran” a term for the digging made by wild pigs. Later on the birth peace known the first municipal primary of the birthplace of the first Spanish priest, Rev. Fr. Martin Yepes who was born in Zumarraga, a town in Spain.
 
On March 13, 1863, the town became an independent parish by virtue of a decree of the King of Spain. 1869, issued on Oct. 12, 1865, confirming the town as a parish under a certain diocese. The parish priest then had its jurisdiction over the islands of Buad and Daram including Paranas.
 
With the coming of the Spanish friars, came educational, spiritual and moral upliftment on the part of the natives. As such, these attracted the people from the neighboring towns and provinces. Foremost of the immigrants were the Zetas from Palo, Leyt, the Astorgas from Barugo, Leyte, the Villaflors from Cariga, Leyte, The Dazas, the Magas and Narios from Catbalogan, Samar, the Carcellars, Zosas, Versosas and Castillos.
 
A well organized local government was established with the executive known as “Capitan”. The early capitanes in the order of succession were: Tenorio RFerrer (Capitan Toyang), Nepomuceno Zeta (Capitan Sinoy), Nicolas Custodio (Capitan Colas), Salvador Zeta (Captain Badoy), Brigido Heal (Capitan Bido), Tomas Bello, Hilario Villaflor and Agustin Astorga. These town officials were appointed by the Gobernadorcillo upon the recommendation of the parish priest who also served as the local “Inspector”. Much had happened during the Spanish era but no record exists showing any evidence. However, tales and riddles of our great grandfathers are told and retold from generation to generation.
 
Americans came. Changes were made from the national to local levels. Free elections were introduced. The local town executive became known as “Presidente”. The presidents in the order of their tenure of office were: Mario Maga, 1910; Luis Villaflor, 1911; Lucio Mijares, 1913; Leodergario Carcellar, 1914; Enrique Nario, 1916; Benito Astorga, 1920; Enrique Nario, 1926; and Rodrigo Daza, 1931.
 
Population growth came mainly by immigration from neighboring places. With the increased population came an increase in industry and business particularly in fishing. It was during this rapid development that the wharf and a part of the breakwater “Sea wall” was constructed. The most illustrious son of Zumaraga, the late Pedro R. Arteche, represented his people in the constitutional convention in 1936; he subsequently occupied the gubernatorial seat of the provinces of Samar. During this period the elected town executive were known as “Mayor”. The elected town mayors up to the outbreak of the second World War were: 1936-1938 Mayor: Emilio Zeta; Vice Mayor: Leodegario Carcellar; 1939-Mayor: Francisco Zosa; Vice Mayor: Francisco Castillo.
 
Naturally after the war, destructions were evident but the local government tried its very best to reconstruct all that were damaged. Efforts were made by the local town officials to make the better Zumaraga before the war, the best. Significant public works improvements were made. Worthy of mention were the cementing of streets, the establishment of the Puericculture Center, putting up an electric light, a Public market, and the construction of additional pre-fab, Marcos type and the Bagong Lipunan buildings. A private Catholic High School was established by few civic-spirited citizens, duly recognized by the government and is presently solving the needs of the youth of the town and its vicinity, for secondary education. The edifice of the Roman Catholic Church which is the material symbol of undying filial live, faith and devotion towards Christianity and to its most honored Patron St. Anthony of Padua, had been built centuries ago, is now being reconstructed. Such project has been attributed to different priest assigned, the Parish Council and the generosity of the Zumaraganhons now residing in Manila, Cebu City, Iligan City, Tacloban City, Catbalogan, and Calbayog  who have prospered in their own lines of profession and industry and through the collective efforts of all Zumaraganhons.
 
The present municipal administration under the energetic leadership of Mayor Bibiano Z. Letaba has done tangible progress as regards cleanliness and peace and order. The municipality is also at present the recipient of several National projects in conformity with the goals and objectives of the New Society. Especially to improve and better the life of the common man.

Geography

Barangays
Zumarraga is divided into 25 barangays.

Climate

Demographics

Economy

References

External links
 Zumarraga Profile at PhilAtlas.com
 [ Philippine Standard Geographic Code]
 Philippine Census Information
 Local Governance Performance Management System

Municipalities of Samar (province)
Island municipalities in the Philippines